Atlético de Kolkata was a professional football club based in Kolkata, West Bengal, which played in the Indian Super League until its merger with Mohun Bagan A.C. in 2020. This list consists of all the head coaches of the team since its inception in 2014 till 2020. Player-managers are also included in the list. This list features all the statistics of each coach and their achievements with the club.

The first full time manager was Antonio López Habas in 2014 under whose guidance the club won its first ever league title in the very first season of the ISL.

List of Managers (Head Coaches)

References 

 
ATK